Ashall is a surname of British origin. Notable people with the surname include:

Craig Ashall (born 1985), English rugby league player
George Ashall (1911–1998), English footballer
Jimmy Ashall (born 1933), English footballer
Thomas Ashall, English footballer

Surnames of British Isles origin